Transporte Colectivo Urbano de Luanda, short TCUL is the public transit company of Angola's capital city, Luanda. TCUL was founded on July 12, 1988. It is a public, i.e. state owned company, depending on the Transport ministry of the central government. Besides 40 bus lines within Luanda province, it also operates over-land bus lines from Luanda to Benguela, Sumbe, N'Dalatando, Malange, Uíge, and Huambo. TCUL disposes of about 300 buses, soon to be extended to 400. 
The CEO is José Soares de Carvalho de 1988 á 2008 - José Mário Silva de 2008 á 2013 - José António de Freitas Neto de 2013 á 2017 - Abel Cosme de 2017 até a data presente .

References

External links
 Official TCUL−Transporte Colectivo Urbano de Luanda website

Luanda
Luanda Province
Transport in Angola